Shillington is a village and civil parish in Bedfordshire, England. Since 1985 its administration has included the village of Higham Gobion, south-west on the minor road leading to the main north–south road in the district, the A6. Farmland and hedgerows forms 95% of the land use and to the south and north of the boundaries is intermittent woodland.

History
On 2 June 1977 the parish was renamed from "Shillington" to "Shillington & Stondon". On 1 April 1985 "Shillington & Stondon" parish was abolished and divided between "Shillington" and Stondon.

Etymology
The village's name evolved through Sethlindone (6th century), Suthlingdon (8th century), Shutlyngdene, Shetelyngton (14th century), and then into an unfortunate Shytlington in official returns and letters of the 17th and 18th centuries, and Shittington even until the 1881 census. The name was later bowdlerised.

Early history
Miscellaneous Roman artefacts have been found.

Shillington is mentioned in the Domesday Book. The entry is headed: "Sethlindone: [overlord] St Benedict's of Ramsey. a broken mill, 2 others".  It contained 34 households, of which four were slaves, however 27 were villagers or villeins, and five were homes of more independent smallholders.  Per year it rendered a large £12, assessed by the Book's compilers to be the same at the conquest twenty years before, had 14 ploughlands and woodland for 100 pigs per year.

The chief hamlets were: Lower Stondon in the north-east, Pegsdon on high ground south of the village on the hills which form the Hertfordshire border, Aspley — with Aspley Bury manor — to the south, Little Holwell, to the east, and Woodmer End and Bury End close to the village on the north.

World War II (1939–1945)

In 1940 a Luftwaffe Dornier 17 was attacked over Great Offley (to the south of Pegsdon), the bomber crashed killing the pilot alongside the road at Pegsdon.

On 21 February 1944 Lancaster LL729 (A4 B) belonging to 115 Squadron RAF left its base at RAF Witchford for a raid on Stuttgart, several hours later the plane crashed killing its crew near Pegsdon whilst trying to return to its base.

Manors
Shillington of Shillington Bury
Until the Dissolution of the Monasteries the powerful Ramsey Abbey held this, with its noble arms of three rams heads with golden horns on a blue band, set on a gold (or yellow backdrop), i.e. "or a bend azure".

Including much of Pegsbury as well as the hub of the village, at the Dissolution it was valued at £88 2s. 10d per year and formed part of the (royal) honour of Ampthill, conferred on Princess Elizabeth, remaining in the Royal Family until after James I (or VI of Scotland).

Its mesne lords (intermediate landlords) included George Rotherham (21 years), Sir Henry Hobart (99 years) for Anthony Chester (assumed title three years later), Dr. Peter Barwick, Roger Gillingham, John Borrett and finally the 1764 will of John Briscoe bequeathing Shillington Bury to Henry Earl of Sussex for life, remainder to the daughters of the late chivalric Bath King of Arms, Grey Longueville. As such, it settled in 1800 on Grey Arnold and cousin Bridget Frances Anne.  Little is known of the mid-19th century except for a sale by a Miss Profit to the father of William Hanscombe, the 1908 lord of the manor.

Shillington or Apsley Bury (Tudor to Georgian subdivision)
This secondary manor was sold in 1760 to Joseph Musgrave, and henceforward it follows the same descent as Aspley Bury manor below.

In 1476, when Thomas Lawley first transferred this so-called manor held of the Abbey to Thomas Rotherham Archbishop of York who left it at his death in 1500 to Thomas Rotherham, son of his brother John.  His grandson Thomas and his wife Alice, for their lives were later heirs, then George, their son, who held the manor from 1561 to 1599.  Then came his son John, having succeeded him, who appears to have alienated (sold or lost) this manor, as in the case of Luton to Sir Robert Napier, who held manorial court here in 1651 and like Luton it remained in this family to the death of Sir John Napier in 1714. In 1748 the manorial court was held by Sir Conyers D'Arcy, and in 1759 by his kinsman, the former Ambassador at Venice (to Italy), and at the Hague (to the Netherlands) Robert Darcy, 4th Earl of Holderness.
 
Apsley or Apsley Bury
Owners in succession from 1504, for this is a later manor, have been only four families: Lane, Eton, Sir John Franklin's and his grandson-in-law's, that of Sir Christopher Musgrave (with subsequent Musgraves until 1908).

Charities
Charity of Edward Pilsworth produced in 1908 a sum of £12 14s "received annually from the Clothworkers Company, London", applied as follows: £10 8s. in money generally among fifty parishioners, £1 to the vicar, 16s. (80% of that amount) for repair of church, and 10s. to the churchwardens who assisted in its administration.

In 1796 Samuel Whitbread, esq., by will, left £10 10s a year, charged on the manor of Cardington, for providing clothing for the inmates (occupants) of the four almshouses situated in the churchyard. In 1897 this annuity was redeemed by making a transfer of India stock.

Demography and topography
A local adage is that 'all roads lead away from Shillington' — somewhat true as more efficient routes avoid the village altogether. Shillington is though not demographically, physically agricultural — mostly green-buffered strings of homes and working farms with farmhouses across a broad area.  In all 1.69;km2 of its 1.78–km2 is 'greenspace' leaving the remainder largely domestic gardens, roads, buildings and watercourses.  The number of residents increased by a net total of 11 (0.5%) in the ten years to 2011.

Localities

Apsley End

Historically Aspley End (see manors above), this small gently sloping hamlet unusually has three moated sites in a line from north to south, all scheduled ancient monuments, two with ponds, one of which was a fishpond.  The other, Pirton Grange has a settling pond, moat remains and enclosure.

Sixteen houses or farmhouses are listed here for architecture, fifteen at Grade II.

Pirton Grange
At Grade II*, this is the highest listed secular building of the parish and has 15th and 16th century parts, a c. 1690 hall roof and mostly timber-framed construction, however Victorian chimneys and fireplaces.

Facilities 
The village is home to Shillington Lower School. Local amenities include two shops (one in the old Methodist church), and several public houses.

All Saints Church
All Saints Church is mostly 14th century, with an 18th-century tower and is grade I listed. The Church is a contender for the most easterly in the triangular chalk belt enclosing most of South-East England all of East Anglia. The building was originally a Saxon monastery, which grew richer and more influential through the mining and selling of coprolite, fossilised dinosaur dung, once used as a fuel and also a fertiliser.

Notes and references
References

Notes

External links

Parish council website
Village website, which includes a parish magazine
Shillington History Society village history society

Villages in Bedfordshire
Civil parishes in Bedfordshire
Bedfordshire folklore
Central Bedfordshire District